Hell Station is a railway station located in the village of Hell in the Municipality of Stjørdal in the Trøndelag county, Norway. It is located at the intersection of the Nordland Line and the Meråker Line.

Information 

Hell Station serves:
 the Meråker Line between the village Hell and Storlien (station) in Sweden.
 the Trøndelag Commuter Rail system

Both services are operated by Class 92 units by SJ Norge.

History 
Planned by architect Paul Armin Due, the present station building at Hell Station was opened in 1902. It replaced an older building of 1881, whose architect was Peter Andreas Blix.

The restaurant was taken over by Norsk Spisevognselskap on 1 October 1922, but returned to private operation in 1934.

Tourist attraction 
Due to its name, Hell Station has become a tourist attraction. While associated with the religious concept Hell by English-speakers, the name Hell derives from Old Norse , which means cave. The Norwegian equivalent to English hell is hel or, more commonly, helvete (compare with Old English hellewīte).

The station's freight building still bears the old sign saying . In Norwegian, Gods-Expedition (archaic) or godsekspedisjon (modern) means freight service or cargo handling. This sign is a popular photo opportunity for foreign English-speaking tourists. Especially in the summer months, it is not unusual for foreigners, when discovering the sign, to disembark the train in order to get a photo. The building is not used for freight anymore. All light freight is handled through post offices or competing companies.

References 

Railway stations in Stjørdal
Railway stations on the Meråker Line
Railway stations on the Nordland Line
Railway stations opened in 1881
1881 establishments in Norway
National Romantic architecture in Norway
Art Nouveau railway stations
Buildings and structures completed in 1902